Blazing Days is a 1927 American silent Western film directed by William Wyler and produced and released by Universal Pictures.

A print is preserved at the Library of Congress and UCLA Film/TV.

Plot

Cast
 Fred Hume - Smilin Sam Perry
 Ena Gregory - Milly Morgan
 Churchill Ross - Jim Morgan
 Bruce Gordon - "Dude" Dutton
 Eva Thatcher - Ma Bascomb
 Bernard Siegel - Ezra Skinner
 Dick L'Estrange - "Turtle-Neck-Pete"

References

External links
 
 AllMovie/synopsis

1927 films
Films directed by William Wyler
Universal Pictures films
1927 Western (genre) films
American black-and-white films
Films with screenplays by Florence Ryerson
Silent American Western (genre) films
Films with screenplays by George H. Plympton
1920s American films